Wichita County (standard abbreviation: WH) is a county located in the U.S. state of Kansas. As of the 2020 census, the county population was 2,152. Its county seat is Leoti.

History

Early history

For many millennia, the Great Plains of North America was inhabited by nomadic Native Americans.  From the 16th century to 18th century, the Kingdom of France claimed ownership of large parts of North America.  In 1762, after the French and Indian War, France secretly ceded New France to Spain, in accordance with the Treaty of Fontainebleau.

19th century
In 1802, Spain returned most of the land to France, but keeping title to about 7,500 square miles.  In 1803, most of the land for modern day Kansas was acquired by the United States from France as part of the 828,000 square mile Louisiana Purchase for 2.83 cents per acre.

In 1854, the Kansas Territory was organized, then in 1861 Kansas became the 34th U.S. state.  In 1886, Wichita County was established.

Geography

Major highways
 Kansas Highway 25
 Kansas Highway 96

Adjacent counties
 Logan County (north)
 Scott County (east)
 Kearny County (south)
 Hamilton County (southwest/Mountain Time border)
 Greeley County (west/Mountain Time border)
 Wallace County (northwest/Mountain Time border)

Demographics

As of the census of 2000, there were 2,531 people, 967 households, and 723 families residing in the county.  The population density was 4 people per square mile (1/km2).  There were 1,119 housing units at an average density of 2 per square mile (1/km2).  The racial makeup of the county was 86.25% White, 0.08% Black or African American, 0.71% Native American, 0.08% Asian, 10.51% from other races, and 2.37% from two or more races.  18.41% of the population were Hispanic or Latino of any race.

There were 967 households, out of which 35.10% had children under the age of 18 living with them, 65.30% were married couples living together, 5.80% had a female householder with no husband present, and 25.20% were non-families. 23.70% of all households were made up of individuals, and 10.00% had someone living alone who was 65 years of age or older.  The average household size was 2.59 and the average family size was 3.07.

In the county, the population was spread out, with 28.70% under the age of 18, 7.30% from 18 to 24, 25.70% from 25 to 44, 22.30% from 45 to 64, and 16.00% who were 65 years of age or older.  The median age was 37 years. For every 100 females there were 104.40 males.  For every 100 females age 18 and over, there were 102.60 males.

The median income for a household in the county was $33,462, and the median income for a family was $41,034. Males had a median income of $27,523 versus $18,807 for females. The per capita income for the county was $16,720.  About 11.20% of families and 14.80% of the population were below the poverty line, including 23.20% of those under age 18 and 4.70% of those age 65 or over.

Government

Presidential elections

Wichita County is overwhelmingly Republican. It was last carried for the Democratic Party by Jimmy Carter in 1976, but since then the only Democrat to win over a quarter of the county's vote has been Michael Dukakis during the 1988 election when the Democratic vote was boosted by reaction against a major Great Plains drought. In the past six elections no Democrat has topped twenty percent of Wichita County's vote – a situation now almost general in the High Plains.

Laws
Although the Kansas Constitution was amended in 1986 to allow the sale of alcoholic liquor by the individual drink with the approval of voters, Wichita County has remained a prohibition, or "dry", county. The latest county alcohol control map indicates the county now allows liquor sales.

Education
 Leoti USD 467

Communities

Cities
 Leoti

Unincorporated communities
† means a Census-Designated Place (CDP) by the United States Census Bureau.
 Coronado
 Lydia
 Marienthal†
 Selkirk

Ghost towns
 Farmer City

Townships
Wichita County has a single township.  None of the cities within the county are considered governmentally independent, and all figures for the townships include those of the cities.  In the following table, the population center is the largest city (or cities) included in that township's population total, if it is of a significant size.

See also

References

Notes

Further reading

 Standard Atlas of Wichita County, Kansas; Geo. A. Ogle & Co; 60 pages; 1920.

External links

County
 
 Wichita County - Directory of Public Officials
Maps
 Wichita County Maps: Current, Historic, KDOT
 Kansas Highway Maps: Current, Historic, KDOT
 Kansas Railroad Maps: Current, 1996, 1915, KDOT and Kansas Historical Society

 
Kansas counties
Kansas placenames of Native American origin
1886 establishments in Kansas
Populated places established in 1886
List of place names of Choctaw origin in the United States